Scaphioides is a genus of spiders in the family Oonopidae. It was first described in 1942 by Elizabeth B. Bryant.

Species
, the World Spider Catalog accepts the following nineteen species:
 Scaphioides bimini Platnick & Dupérré, 2012 — Bahama Is.
 Scaphioides camaguey Platnick & Dupérré, 2012 — Cuba
 Scaphioides campeche Platnick & Dupérré, 2012 — Mexico
 Scaphioides cletus (Chickering, 1969) — Jamaica
 Scaphioides cobre Platnick & Dupérré, 2012 — Cuba
 Scaphioides econotus (Chickering, 1969) — Puerto Rico
 Scaphioides gertschi Platnick & Dupérré, 2012 — Bahama Is.
 Scaphioides granpiedra Platnick & Dupérré, 2012 — Cuba
 Scaphioides halatus (Chickering, 1969) — Caribbean (Leeward Is.)
 Scaphioides hoffi (Chickering, 1969) — Jamaica
 Scaphioides irazu Platnick & Dupérré, 2012 — Costa Rica
 Scaphioides miches Platnick & Dupérré, 2012 — Hispaniola
 Scaphioides minuta (Chamberlin & Ivie, 1935) — USA
 Scaphioides nitens (Bryant, 1942) — Virgin Is.
 Scaphioides phonetus (Chickering, 1969) — Puerto Rico
 Scaphioides reducta Bryant, 1942 — Virgin Is.
 Scaphioides reductoides Platnick & Dupérré, 2012 — Virgin Is.
 Scaphioides siboney Platnick & Dupérré, 2012 — Cuba
 Scaphioides yateras Platnick & Dupérré, 2012 — Cuba

References

Oonopidae
Araneomorphae genera

Spiders of North America